The men's lightweight (−74 kilograms) event at the 2010 Asian Games took place on 17 November 2010 at Guangdong Gymnasium, Guangzhou, China.

Schedule
All times are China Standard Time (UTC+08:00)

Results 
Legend
DQ — Won by disqualification

Final

Top half

Bottom half

References

Results

External links
Official website

Taekwondo at the 2010 Asian Games